Marcel Thil (29 May 1904 – 14 August 1968) was a French boxer and middleweight world champion. Statistical boxing website BoxRec rates Thil as the second best European boxer ever across all weight divisions, after Joe Calzaghe.

Early life
Thil was born in Saint-Dizier, a commune in the Haute-Marne department in north-eastern France. He started boxing at a very young age and turned professional at the age of 16. Thil was a journeyman boxer for a number of years but as he gained experience and matured to full adult strength, he developed power in both hands and began to win regularly by knockout (KO).

Career
Thil won the French middleweight boxing championship in 1928 and captured the Europe title the following year. After losing his European championship in 1930, Thil won his next 15 fights and then defeated Gorilla Jones by a controversial 11th-round disqualification to capture the National Boxing Association (NBA) world middleweight championship and the vacant International Boxing Union (IBU) world middleweight championship on June 11, 1932, in Paris, France. With his championship victory, Thil became the toast of Paris. He was a major celebrity and a good friend of celebrated actor Jean Gabin.

Thil successfully defended the title on July 4, 1932, with a 15-round unanimous decision against Len Harvey, but then went more than a year without a title defense. Thil was stripped by the NBA for failing to make a title defense by August 15, 1933, but he remained the IBU champion.

On May 22, 1933, Thil won against German Jewish refugee Eric Seelig, former holder of the German middleweight and light heavyweight championships, at the Palais de Sports in Paris, in a twelve-round points decision.  By a few accounts, the bout was for the world title, but the boxers were overweight according to Le Petit Parisien.  On January 29, 1934, Seelig fought Marcel Thil again in Paris, losing in a twelve-round points decision.

In addition to defending the IBU middleweight championship, Thil moved up a weight class to win the European light-heavyweight title in 1934. He would successfully defend the title once.

After successfully defending the IBU and Ring Magazine middleweight titles 11 times, Thil fought Fred Apostoli in a non-title bout on September 23, 1937, in New York City. It was a non-title affair because the New York State Athletic Commission, which recognized Freddie Steele as world middleweight champion, said they would sanction the fight only if Thil agreed not to put his championship on the line. Apostoli won by a 10th-round technical knockout (TKO). The fight was stopped due to a severe cut over the right eye of Thil, who was ahead on points at the time of the stoppage. Shortly after the loss, the 33-year-old Thil retired from boxing vacating his titles.

Later life and death
Thil remained active in boxing circles as an adviser and cornerman and was named honorary president of the Dieppe Boxing Club. He made a living with a company in Reims until retiring to a home in Cannes on the French Riviera.

Thil died at his home in Cannes on August 14, 1968, at the age of 64. Over the last couple years of his life, he was involved in two car accidents, from which he never fully recovered. Thil is buried in the Grand Jas Cemetery.

Honors
Marcel Thil was posthumously inducted into the International Boxing Hall of Fame at Canastota, New York in 2005. In France, a street was named in his honor in his birthplace of Saint-Dizier, and both a street and a sports stadium carry his name in the city of Reims.

Professional boxing record

References

External links
 
International Boxing Hall of Fame

|-

|-

|-

|-

1904 births
1968 deaths
People from Saint-Dizier
French male boxers
Middleweight boxers
World middleweight boxing champions
World boxing champions
Burials at the Cimetière du Grand Jas
Sportspeople from Haute-Marne